"Redemption" is the lead single from the album Threads of Life by American heavy metal band Shadows Fall. The song has a thrash melodic with heavy riffs. The song made its premiere on Sirius Radio's Hard Attack station on February 16, 2007 and was released on iTunes on February 20. The song was sent to radio in March. On December 6, 2007, Redemption was nominated for a Grammy for Best Metal Performance. It appeared on the game Madden NFL 08.

Track listing

Music video
The band filmed a music video for "Redemption", directed by Zach Merck. The video shows the band playing the song on a roof. It was filmed in Los Angeles.

Chart position
The song peaked at #36 on the Billboard 200 mainstream rock chart.

Credits

Shadows Fall
Brian Fair – lead vocals
Jon Donais – lead guitar
Matt Bachand – rhythm guitar, backing vocals
Paul Romanko – bass guitar
Jason Bittner – drums

2007 singles
Atlantic Records singles
Shadows Fall songs
2007 songs
Song recordings produced by Nick Raskulinecz